DIC Movie Toons (originally known as the Nickelodeon Sunday Movie Toons in the United States) were a series of animated made-for-TV movies produced by DIC Entertainment, which lasted for just one season (2002) on Nickelodeon in the United States. It started in 2002, beginning on October 6 and ending on December 29.

All films are nowadays a property of WildBrain, which holds the rights to most of DIC's library.

List of movies
Initially, 39 films were ordered from Nickelodeon to air, with later productions including adaptations of concepts such as Black Beauty and The Wonderful Wizard of Oz, but only 13 of them did so. With the exception of Groove Squad, which was a completely original story (it was about a group of crime-fighting cheerleaders), all of the made-for-TV films were either based on various DIC productions such as Inspector Gadget, Sabrina: The Animated Series, and Dennis the Menace, or adapted from stories from classic literature such as Treasure Island and 20,000 Leagues Under the Sea. In order, the movies featured were:

 Inspector Gadget's Last Case (based on both the original 1983 Inspector Gadget series and Disney's 1999 live-action movie, but with character designs from Gadget & the Gadgetinis) (10/6/02)
 Sabrina: Friends Forever (based on Sabrina: The Animated Series)
 Time Kid (based on The Time Machine by H. G. Wells) (10/20/02)
 Dennis the Menace: Cruise Control (based on the 1986–1988 animated series version of Dennis the Menace) (10/27/02)
 The Archies in Jugman (based on the Archie universe as portrayed in Archie's Weird Mysteries) (11/3/02)
 Dinosaur Island (based on The Lost World by Sir Arthur Conan Doyle) (11/10/02)
 My Fair Madeline (based on Madeline) (11/17/02)
 Groove Squad (11/24/02)
 Treasure Island (based on Treasure Island by Robert Louis Stevenson) (12/1/02)
 Charles Dickens A Christmas Carol (based on A Christmas Carol by Charles Dickens) (12/8/02)
 Globehunters: An Around the World in 80 Days Adventure (based on Around the World in Eighty Days by Jules Verne) (12/15/02)
 The Amazing Zorro (based on Johnston McCulley's Zorro) (12/22/02)
 20,000 Leagues Under The Sea (based on 20,000 Leagues Under the Sea by Jules Verne) (12/29/02)

International broadcasts
In October 2002, Disney Television International purchased the broadcast rights to the movies for DIC to air on Disney Channel, Toon Disney and Playhouse Disney networks in France, Germany, Italy, Southeast Asia, United Kingdom, Ireland, Australia, New Zealand, Spain, Portugal, the Middle East and Scandinavia.

In November 2002, Super RTL purchased the German free-to-air broadcasting rights to the films as part of a six-year deal with DIC. Other networks like YTV in Canada, Cartoon Network Japan, Televisa in Mexico and RCTV in Venezuela purchased the broadcast rights to the movies in their respective regions.

Later on, DIC would pre-sell the movies to ITV in the UK, Club RTL in Belgium, Mediatrade in Italy, Alter TV in Greece and Anteve in Indonesia.

Home media
All of the movies apart from A Christmas Carol were later released to VHS and DVD in the United States by MGM Home Entertainment. In 2008, Gaiam re-released the films on DVD.

In the United Kingdom, a selection of the films were distributed through Prism Leisure and later Boulevard Entertainment.

In France, Italy, Spain/Latin America, Australia and Ukraine, the movies were released by TF1 Video, Eagle Pictures, Sum, Shock and ICTV respectively.

In Poland, these movies were dubbed and distributed by Kartunz.

Notes and references
Notes

References

American motion picture television series
DIC Entertainment films
Television series by DIC Entertainment
Television series by DHX Media